Sky Sentinel is an unmanned aerial vehicle (UAV) airship designed for long-duration operation of an automated surveillance platform.   

A follow-on model—Sky Sentinel 2— is planned to support flying at altitudes up to  while remaining aloft for up to 26 hours with a  sensor suite.

References

Airships of the United States
Unmanned aerial vehicles of the United States